The Molecular Modelling Toolkit (MMTK) is an open-source software package written in Python, which performs common tasks in molecular modelling.

, MMTK consists of about 18,000 lines of Python code, 12,000 lines of hand-written C code, and some machine-generated C code.

Features
 construction of molecular systems, with special support for proteins and nucleic acids
 infinite systems or periodic boundary conditions (orthorhombic elementary cells)
 common geometrical operations on coordinates
 rigid-body fits
 visualization using external PDB and VRML viewers; animation of dynamics trajectories and normal modes
 the AMBER 94 force field, with several options for handling electrostatic interactions
 a deformation force field for fast normal mode calculations on proteins
 energy minimization (steepest descent and conjugate gradient)
 molecular dynamics (with optional thermostat, barostat, and distance constraints)
 normal mode analysis
 trajectory operations
 point charge fits
 molecular surface calculations
 interfaces to other programs

See also
 Software for molecular mechanics modelling

References

External links 
 
 Background information

Molecular modelling software
Molecular dynamics software
Python (programming language) software